Delta Sagittae (Delta Sge, δ Sagittae, δ Sge) is a binary star in the constellation of Sagitta, with an apparent magnitude of +3.68. The primary component is a red M-type bright giant, and the secondary is a B-type main-sequence star. It is approximately 430 light years from Earth, based on its Gaia Data Release 2 parallax.

Delta Sagittae is a spectroscopic binary with a composite spectrum, meaning that light from both stars can be detected. It has an orbital period of about 10 years and an eccentricity of about 0.44.  It is also a variable star, with its brightness changing between a maximum of magnitude 3.75 and a minimum of 3.83 in an unpredictable way.

Delta Sagittae is moving through the Galaxy at a speed of 9.8 km/s relative to the Sun. Its projected Galactic orbit carries it between 23,800 and 35,300 light years from the center of the Galaxy.

Naming

References

Sagittae, Delta
Sagitta (constellation)
M-type bright giants
Sagittae, 07
097365
7536
187076
Durchmusterung objects
Spectroscopic binaries
Slow irregular variables